Romuald Denis Hayes (1892–1945) was a Roman Catholic Bishop of Rockhampton in Queensland, Australia, from 2 January 1932 until his death on 25 October 1945. Educated for the priesthood at St. Patricks, Manly, and in Rome. in 1920 he joined the  Missionary Society of St. Columban the first Australian to do so, and was sent to their mission in Nebraska, USA.

References 

1892 births
1945 deaths
Roman Catholic bishops of Rockhampton